True Beauty is a South Korean television series starring Moon Ga-young, Cha Eun-woo, Hwang In-youp, and Park Yoo-na. Based on the Line Webtoon of the same name by Yaongyi, it centers on a high school girl who, after being bullied and discriminated against because of being perceived as ugly, masters the art of makeup to transform herself into a gorgeous "goddess". It aired on tvN from December 9, 2020 to February 4, 2021, every Wednesday and Thursday at 22:30 (KST).

Plot
This series is about Lim Ju-kyung, a high school student who always had a complex about her appearance since she was young. To hide her bare face, she started to wear heavy make-up. Her excellent make-up skills makes her beautiful, and convinces others that her beautiful, made-up face is her natural appearance. She befriends with her high school mate Lee Su-ho, a wealthy, but cold boy, and Han Seo-jun, an aggressive student with good talents. This plot follows Ju-kyung as she navigates her daily life and goal of becoming a cosmetologist.

Cast

Main
 Moon Ga-young as Lim Ju-kyung
Lee Go-eun as young Ju-kyung
 A newcomer student of Class 2-5 recently transferred to Saebom High School; Having been constantly discriminated by her family and bullied by her peers in previous school due to being perceived as ugly, she masters to wear makeup by binge-watching tutorial videos in the Internet and her makeover proves to be transformative as she quickly rises to fame and her peers in new school call her a "goddess", unaware of her real appearance.  Ju-kyung prefers reading horror comic books  and listening to heavy metal music.
 Cha Eun-woo as Lee Su-ho
Lee Seung-woo as young Su-ho
 A student of Class 2-5 in Saebom High School; He is very popular for his handsome looks and being the top of his class. His dysfunctional family and a tragic incident from a year ago have turned him into an ice-cold boy who hates being the center of attention. He is formerly best friends with Seo-jun. Su-ho shares Ju-kyung's penchant for horror comic books.
 Hwang In-youp as Han Seo-jun
 A student of Class 2-5 in Saebom High School; Seo-jun is a handsome and equally-popular student at his school who, despite being a tough-looking,  is a kind, loving and soft person, especially to his mother and sister. He is formerly best friends with Su-ho and a former idol trainee but a tragic incident a year ago leads to him abandoning his path to stardom and severing his friendship with Su-ho, with whom he has since become extremely hostile.
 Park Yoo-na as Kang Su-jin
 A student of Class 2-5 in Saebom High School; She is Su-ho's childhood friend and becomes close friends with the transferee Ju- but is being forced by her parents to excel at school and always being compared with Su-ho.

Supporting

Lim Ju-kyung's family
 Jang Hye-jin as Hong Hyun-sook
 Lim Jae-pil’s wife and mother of Hee-kyung and, Ju-kyung and Ju-young. She is the matriarch of the Lim family who owns a beauty shop named Pandora which is popular among older women.
 Park Ho-san as Lim Jae-pil
 Hong Hyun-sook’s husband and father of Hee-kyung and, Ju-kyung and Ju-young. He loses a great sum of money to a dubious investment which leads to the family having to move back to their old house.
 Im Se-mi as Lim Hee-kyung
Park Seo-kyung as young Hee-kyung (Ep. 1)
 Ju-kyung's older sister; She is adored by the family for being pretty and intelligent. She works at Move Entertainment and develops feelings for Ju-kyung's homeroom teacher Han Joon-woo.
 Kim Min-gi as Lim Ju-young
Park Ju-hwan as young Ju-young (Ep. 1)
 Ju-kyung's younger brother; He harbors a crush on Han Seo-jun’s younger sister Go-woon after hearing her sing.

Lee Su-ho's family 
 Jung Joon-ho as Lee Joo-heon 
 Su-ho's father; He is a famous actor and CEO of Move Entertainment who is quick to find a new woman after his wife died, much to Su-ho's resentment.

Han Seo-jun's family
 Yeo Joo-ha as Han Go-woon
 A student at Saebom High School; Seo-jun's younger sister. She has great singing talent, but is bullied by her peers for being perceived as ugly. She befriends with Ju-kyung after Ju-kyung saves her from bullies.
 Park Hyun-jung|ko|박현정 (배우) as Lee Mi-hyang
 Mother of Seo-jun and Go-woon; an acquaintance of Hyun-sook (Ju-kyung’s mother). She suffers from an illness requiring a kidney transplant.

Kang Su-jin's family
 Seo Sang-won as Kang Jun-hyuk
 Su-jin's father; professor and doctor-in-charge of a medical school. He teaches Su-jin to be competitive and abuses her mentally and physically.
 Yoo Dam-yeon as Kim Ji-yeon
 Su-jin's mother. Passive with her husband's abuse at first. Later divorces him and leaves Korea with Su-jin.

Saebom High School
Oh Eui-shik as Han Joon-woo
 Homeroom teacher of Class 2-5 and literature teacher in Saebom High School. He falls in love with Hee-kyung.
 Kang Min-ah as Choi Soo-ah 
 A student of Class 2-5 in Saebom High School; Ju-kyung and Su-jin's best friend and classmate; Tae-hoon's girlfriend.
  as Yoo Tae-hoon
 A student of Class 2-5 in Saebom High School; Soo-ah's boyfriend. Tae-hoon often seeks the approval of Su-ho and later becomes friends with him.
 Lee Sang-jin as Ahn Hyun-gyu 
 A student of Class 2-5 in Saebom High School.
 Han Yi-young as Ha Ji-young
 A student of Class 2-5 in Saebom High School.
 Lee Woo-je as Kim Cho-rong
 A student in Saebom High School; Seo-jun's friend.
 Kim Hyun-ji as Kim Si-hyun
 A student in Saebom High School.
  as Jin Hee-jeong
 A Year 1 student in Saebom High School;  webmaster of school's online community. She once bullied Go-woon. 
  as the vice-principal of Saebom High School.

Yongpa High School
 Shin Jae-hwi as Lee Sung-yong
 A student in Yongpa High School.  He is a bully who formerly acquainted with Seo-jun.
 Jeon Hye-won as Park Sae-mi 
 A student of Yongpa High School. A popular girl with pretty face, who used to bully Ju-kyung before she transferred to Saebom High School.
 Oh Yoo-jin as Joo Hye-min
 A student in Yongpa High School who later transfers to Saebom High School after being bullied tremendously at her old school.
 Seo Hye-won as Park Ji-hee
 A student in Yongpa High School; a friend of  Park Sae-mi.

Others
  as Wang Ja
 The owner of Prince Comics, the comic book store that Ju-kyung and Su-ho frequents.
  as Columbus Park
 The man who tricks Ju-kyung's father out of his money.

Special appearances

Kang Chan-hee as Jung Se-yeon(Ep. 1, 4–5, 11–12, 16) 
 Su-ho and Seo-jun’s late best friend. Se-yeon was a member of a boy group under Move Entertainment. A victim of harsh online shaming and fake scandals, he committed suicide by jumping off a tall building. His tragic death becomes the center of the broken friendship between Seo-jun and Su-ho, Seo-jun's animosity towards Su-ho's father and Su-ho's life of immense guilt.
 Go Woo-ri as Selena
 A famous makeup-artist whom Ju-kyung idolizes and later works for.
 Lee Tae-ri as Wang Hyun-bin (Ep. 1)
 A handsome nutritionist of Yongpa High School's canteen whom Ju-kyung had a crush on.
 Ok Joo-ri as a neighbourhood woman (Ep. 1)
  as a neighbourhood woman (Ep. 1–2)
 Lee Jae-eun as Su-ho's housekeeper (Ep. 3)
 Song Hoon as a history teacher (Ep. 3)
 Uhm Tae-yoon as a customer (Ep. 3)
  as Joo-heon's associate (Ep. 3)
 Jang Young-hyun as a guy at the convenience store (Ep. 3)
  as a guy at the convenience store (Ep. 3)
 Ham Tae-gyun as a guy at the convenience store (Ep. 3)
 Kim Hye-yoon as Eun Dan-oh (Ep. 4)
 Baek Kyung's classmate and fiancée; Ha-ru's girlfriend whom Suho mistakes as Jugyeong
 Lee Jae-wook as Baek Kyung (Ep. 4)
 Dan-oh's classmate and fiancé whom Suho mistakes as Woo-hyun, Jugyeong's blind date.
 Jung Gun-joo as Ryu Hyung-jin
 A baseball star playing for Seonil High School who has a crush on Ju-kyung and asks her out. (Ep. 7)
 Woo Hyun as the camping site manager (Ep. 8)
  as MC Jaerong, recreation MC (Ep. 8)
 Jung Ye-nok as the head of imaginary bullies (Ep. 9)
 Lee Han-wi as Min Jae-joon (Ep. 13)
 A plastic surgeon. 
 Kim Young-dae as Oh Nam-joo (Ep. 15)
 A stranger whom Ju-kyung runs into at Namsan Tower, and she mistaken him as Su-ho.
 Lim Da-young as Chae-ni (Ep. 15–16)
 A celebrity under Move Entertainment.

Episodes

Production
In July 2019, it was announced that the Line Webtoon True Beauty would be adapted into a television series. In August 2020, the production team confirmed the casting of Moon Ga-young, Cha Eun-woo and Hwang In-youp in the lead roles. The first script reading session was held in October 2020. Filming was temporarily halted in late December 2020 after  tested positive for COVID-19. The first stills from filming were released on November 10, 2020, one month prior to the series premiere.

Release
The series was originally made available for streaming through Viu and Rakuten Viki. In 2021, it became available on Amazon Prime Video from October 21. In 2023, it became available in Netflix in selected territories.

Original soundtrack

True Beauty: Original Soundtrack 
The following is the official track list of True Beauty: Original Soundtrack album, which was released by Stone Music Entertainment on February 5, 2021. The tracks with no indicated lyricists and composers are the drama's musical score; the artists indicated for these tracks are the tracks' composers themselves.

The album peaked on number 5 on weekly Gaon Album Chart and as of March 2021, 40,786 copies have been sold.

Singles 
The following is the track list of singles from True Beauty: Original Soundtrack.

Part 1

Part 2

Part 3

Part 4

Part 5

Part 6

Part 7

Part 8

Viewership

Accolades

Notes

References

External links
  
 
 
 True Beauty on Viki
 True Beauty at Daum 
 True Beauty at Line Webtoon 

TVN (South Korean TV channel) television dramas
Korean-language television shows
2020 South Korean television series debuts
2021 South Korean television series endings
South Korean romantic comedy television series
Television shows based on South Korean webtoons
Television series by Studio Dragon
Television series by Bon Factory Worldwide
Television series by Studio N (Naver)
South Korean teen dramas
Television series about teenagers
Television shows set in Seoul
Television productions suspended due to the COVID-19 pandemic
South Korean high school television series